Mandibular means "related to the mandible (lower jaw bone)". Terms containing "mandibular" include:

 Mandibular canal, a canal within the mandible that contains the inferior alveolar nerve, inferior alveolar artery, and inferior alveolar vein
 Mandibular fossa, the depression in the temporal bone that articulates with the mandibular condyle
 Mandibular nerve, the largest of the three branches of the trigeminal nerve
 Mandibular prominence, an embryological structure which gives rise to the lower portion of the face
 Torus mandibularis, a bony growth in the mandible along the surface nearest to the tongue

See also
 Submandibular gland